The Battle of Rotebro  was fought on 28 September 1497 between the armies of John, King of Denmark and Sten Sture the Elder, the deposed regent of Sweden. Sten Sture had fallen out of favor with the nobility and was deposed on March 1497 of his post as Regent of Sweden. The Danes invaded Sweden in July of that year, and defeated Sten's peasant army on 28 September at the village of Rotebro north of Stockholm.

References 

1497 in Europe
Rotebro
Rotebro
Rotebro
Denmark–Sweden relations